Deefgea is a genus of bacteria in the phylum Pseudomonadota. Deefgea are described as Gram-negative, rod-shaped, facultative anaerobes which generally occur singly. Deefgea are motile, either by a single flagellum or two polar flagella. They are both catalase and oxidase positive.

Etymology
The name Deefgea derives from:
 New Latin feminine gender noun Deefgea, arbitrary name derived from the acronym DFG for Deutsche Forschungsgemeinschaft (German Science Foundation).

The genus contains 2 species (including basonyms and synonyms), namely
 D. chitinilytica ( Chen et al. 2010, ; New Latin noun chitinum, chitin; New Latin feminine gender adjective lytica (from Greek feminine gender adjective lutikē), able to loosen, able to dissolve; New Latin feminine gender adjective chitinilytica, chitin-dissolving.)
 D. rivuli ( Stackebrandt et al. 2007,  (Type species of the genus).;: Latin genitive case masculine gender noun rivuli, of/from a rivulet, a small brook.)

See also
 Bacterial taxonomy
 Microbiology

References 

Bacteria genera
Neisseriales